Bruce Stokes Collie (born June 27, 1962) is a former professional American football offensive lineman in the National Football League (NFL) for the San Francisco 49ers and the Philadelphia Eagles.  He played college football at the University of Texas at Arlington and was drafted in the fifth round of the 1985 NFL Draft.

A born-again Christian, Collie now resides with his wife, Holly, and 13 children Devyn (1993), Jordyn (1994), Jensen (1995), Denton (1996), Branson (1997), Cameron (1998), Bergyn (2000), Calyn (2001), Hadyn (2002), Hansen (2004), Daltyn (2005), Jadyn (2007) and Dennison (2009) in Wimberley, Texas, where he brews beer & sells pizza. He operated Wimberley Brewing Company & Brewster's Pizza, a micro-brewery & pizza business in a building he designed and built himself located at "The Junction" on Ranch Road-12 @ FM-32 in Wimberley, Texas, until it closed in 2020. In 2010, he coached the San Marcos Homeschool Panther's varsity football team. 
 

 Collie is an advocate of the Tim Tebow bill that would allow homeschoolers in Texas to play sports offered by public schools.

References

1962 births
Living people
Texas–Arlington Mavericks football players
San Francisco 49ers players
Philadelphia Eagles players
American football offensive guards
German players of American football
People from Wimberley, Texas
Sportspeople from Nuremberg